Huntington is the name of two places in the State of Florida:

Huntington, Marion County, Florida
Huntington, Putnam County, Florida